Sue Schurman is an American scholar, currently distinguished professor at Rutgers School of Management and Labor Relations and dean from 2011 to 2015.

Education 
Schurman earned her PhD from University of Michigan.

Career 
In 1997, Schurman became the founding president of National Labor College.
In 2011, Schurman became the dean of Rutgers School of Management and Labor Relations.

References

Year of birth missing (living people)
Living people
Rutgers University faculty
Michigan State University alumni
University of Michigan alumni